R v Associated Northern Collieries (the Coal-Vend Case) is a decision of the High Court of Australia concerning the activities of the Coal-Vend cartel. The convictions entered by Isaacs J in this decision were later set aside by the Full Court (Griffith CJ, Barton and O'Connor JJ) in Adelaide Steamship Co Ltd v The King.

Decision

Following a trial in the original jurisdiction of the High Court, Isaacs J convicted each of the 40 defendants (16 individuals, 22 corporations and 2 commercial trusts) of cartel offences against the Australian Industries Preservation Act, a (now repealed) antitrust law based on the United States' Sherman Act.

Political context

The trial was eagerly followed in the news media. Newspapers such as the Sydney Morning Herald regularly reported on the daily course of the trial.

See also
 Huddart, Parker & Co Pty Ltd v Moorehead (1909) 8 CLR 330
 Melbourne Steamship Co Ltd v Moorehead (1912) 15 CLR 333

References

High Court of Australia cases
1911 in Australian law
1911 in case law